Matthew Bryan Medved is an American entrepreneur, journalist, DJ and record producer. He is the co-founder and CEO of nft now, a web3 media company focused on non-fungible token (NFT) coverage and curation.

Medved previously served as senior vice president of content at lifestyle publisher Modern Luxury  and editor-in-chief of Spin, an American music and culture magazine. He is the founder of Billboard Dance, Billboard's dance and electronic music channel.

In 2022, Yahoo! Finance ranked Medved as one of the top ten most influential figures in the NFT space.

Background 
Medved grew up in Rochester, New York. Medved is a graduate of Northwestern University where he majored in journalism and worked for the Medill Innocence Project.

While earning law and master's degrees from George Washington University, Medved worked for global conflict resolution NGO Search for Common Ground in Nigeria. He is based in New York City.

Career

Billboard 
In May 2015, Medved launched Billboard Dance, Billboard's dance and electronic music channel. He played a role in breaking future headliners like Kygo and Marshmello.

In September 2017, Medved co-hosted the inaugural Electronic Music Awards in Los Angeles.

In March 2018, Medved launched Billboard'''s new ranking of dance musicians titled Billboard Dance 100.

In April 2018, Medved broke the news of Swedish star Avicii's death in Billboard.During his time at Billboard, artists like Alison Wonderland, REZZ, TOKiMONSTA, DJ Snake, Marshmello, Zedd, Major Lazer, The Chainsmokers, Diplo, Kygo, Martin Garrix and Steve Angello appeared on the magazine's cover.

 Spin 
In December 2018, Medved was named editor-in-chief of Spin. During his tenure, artists like Billie Eilish, Ty Dolla $ign, Charli XCX and Avicii graced the publication's cover. Medved exited with the title's sale to private equity in 2020.

 Modern Luxury 
In August 2020, Medved was named senior vice president of content at lifestyle publisher Modern Luxury, whose titles include Ocean Drive, Hamptons, Gotham, LA Confidential, Aspen, Boston Common, Philadelphia Style, Chicago Social, San Francisco, Vegas and more.

 nft now 
In January 2021, Medved co-founded web3 digital media company nft now with Alejandro Navia and Sam Hysell.

In December 2021, nft now partnered with Christie's on an exhibition titled "The Gateway" during Art Basel Miami and co-curated the major auction house's sale that closed at $3.6 million.

 DJ 
As a DJ/producer, Medved has performed at global festivals including Tomorrowland, Electric Daisy Carnival, Electric Zoo, Billboard'' Hot 100 Festival,  Sunset Music Festival, Sunburn Festival, Camp Bisco, Oasis Festival and Abroadfest.

He has signed releases to Interscope Records, RCA Records, Astralwerks and Downtown Records.

References

American DJs
Electronic dance music DJs
1985 births
Living people
Musicians from Rochester, New York